Victor Amadeus may refer to: 

Victor Amadeus I, Duke of Savoy (1587–1637)
Victor Amadeus II of Sardinia (1666–1732) grandson of the above
Victor Amadeus III of Sardinia (1726–1796), grandson of the above
Victor Amadeus, Prince of Piedmont (1699–1715), son of Victor Amadeus II
Victor Amadeus I, Prince of Carignan (1690–1741), son in law of Victor Amadeus II
Victor Amadeus II, Prince of Carignan (1743–1780), grandson of the above
Victor Amadeus, Landgrave of Hesse-Rotenburg (1779–1834) 
Victor Amadeus of Anhalt-Bernburg-Schaumburg-Hoym (1744–1790)
Victor Amadeus, Prince of Anhalt-Bernburg (1634–1718)